Operation Safeguard is a contingency plan to deal with prison overcrowding in the United Kingdom; it involves using cells at police stations as accommodation for prisoners when the number of cells in prisons becomes critically low.  On 9 October 2006, the Home Secretary John Reid announced the implementation of Operation Safeguard as the prison population had reached 79,843 leaving only 125 spaces.

The policy is supported by the Association of Chief Police Officers, it outlined a list of criteria for prisoners who should not be held in police station cells under Safeguard, including among others: women, juveniles and those with mental health problems or those involved in a Crown Court trial.

Alternatives to Operation Safeguard
The government has considered several alternatives to Safeguard, including repatriating foreign prisoners to their home country, with a financial incentive. Other ways of reducing the prison population include:

 Early executive release
 Deportation of foreign prisoners
 Use of a prison ship

Lord Phillips, the former Lord Chief Justice, also suggested a greater use of community sentences could reduce the pressure on prisons.

See also
 United Kingdom prison population
 Prison
 Prison reform
 List of prisons in the United Kingdom
 Prison categories (UK)
 Prison Officers' Association

References

External links
 UK Government: Home Office
 UK Government: Prison Service
 Prison Officers' Association

Penal system in the United Kingdom
2006 in the United Kingdom